The 1988 Champ Car season may refer to:
 the 1987–88 USAC Championship Car season, which was just one race, the 72nd Indianapolis 500
 the 1988 CART PPG Indy Car World Series, sanctioned by CART, who later became Champ Car